Requiem for a Gringo (also known as Duel in the Eclipse) is a 1968 Italian-Spanish Spaghetti Western film directed by Eugenio Martín and José Luis Merino and starring Lang Jeffries, Fernando Sancho and Femi Benussi. It is most known for the gore and psychedelic elements. It is the only western film of the Eurospy and peplum film genre star Lang Jeffries. The film is partially based on Masaki Kobayashi's film Harakiri.

Plot
Spaghetti western starring Lang Jeffries. A man with special knowledge of the heavens looks to avenge his brother's murder. He targets a gang of Mexican bandits who have occupied a hacienda and picks the day of an eclipse to bring his pan to fruition.

Cast
 Lang Jeffries as Ross Logan / Django 
 Femi Benussi as Alma (as Femy Benussi)
 Fernando Sancho as  Porfirio Carranza 
 Carlo Gaddi as Ted Corbin 
 Rubén Rojo as Tom Leader
 Carlo Simoni as Dan
 Aldo Sambrell as Charley Fair
 Marisa Paredes as Nina
 Giuliana Garavaglia as Lupe (as Giuly Garr) 
 Ángel Álvarez as Samuel

References

External links
 
 Requiem for a Gringo at Variety Distribution

1960s Spanish-language films
Spaghetti Western films
Spanish Western (genre) films
1968 Western (genre) films
1968 films
Films shot in Almería
Films scored by Angelo Francesco Lavagnino
1960s Italian films
1960s Spanish films